The Spaghetti House siege took place between 28 September and 3 October 1975. An attempted robbery of the Spaghetti House restaurant in Knightsbridge, London, went wrong and the police were quickly on the scene. The three robbers took the staff down into a storeroom and barricaded themselves in. They released all the hostages unharmed after six days. Two of the gunmen gave themselves up; the ringleader, Franklin Davies, shot himself in the stomach. All three were later imprisoned, as were two of their accomplices.

The three robbers had been involved in black liberation organisations and maintained consistently that they were acting for political reasons. The police did not believe them, and stated that this was a criminal act, not a political one.

The police used fibre optic camera technology for live surveillance, and monitored the actions and conversations of the gunmen from the audio and visual output. The feed was watched by a forensic psychiatrist who advised police on the state of the men's minds, and how to best manage the ongoing negotiations.

Background
Post-Second World War Britain had a shortage of labour, which led to official policies to attract workers from the British Empire and Commonwealth countries. These people were placed in low-pay, low-skill employment, which forced them to live in poor housing. Economic circumstances and what were seen by many in the black communities as racist policies applied by the British government, led to a rise in militancy, particularly among the West Indian community; their feelings were exacerbated by police harassment and discrimination in the education sector. Ambalavaner Sivanandan, the director of the Institute of Race Relations in the mid-1970s, identifies that while the first generation had become partly assimilated into British society, the second generation were increasingly rebellious.

The ringleader of the attempted robbery of a branch of the Spaghetti House restaurant was Franklin Davies, a 28-year-old Nigerian student who had previously served time in prison for armed robbery; he was accompanied by two men, Wesley Dick (later known as Shujaa Moshesh), a 24-year-old West Indian, and Anthony "Bonsu" Munroe, a 22-year-old Guyanese. All three had been involved in black liberation organisations. Davies had tried to enlist in the guerrilla armies of Zimbabwe African National Union and FRELIMO in Africa; Munroe had links to the Black Power movement; Dick was an attendee at meetings of the Black Panthers, the Black Liberation Front (BLF), the Fasimba, and the Black Unity and Freedom Party; he regularly visited the offices of the Institute of Race Relations to volunteer and access their library. Sivanandan and the historian Rob Waters identify that the three men were attempting to obtain money to "finance black supplementary schools and support African liberation struggles".

In the mid-1970s the branch managers of the London-based Spaghetti House restaurant chain would close their branches every Saturday night and meet at the company's Knightsbridge branch. The outlet would be closed, but managers would deposit the week's takings there, before it was paid into a night safe at a nearby bank.

Attempted robbery: 28 September 1975
At approximately 1:30 am on Sunday 28 September 1975 Davies, Moshesh and Munroe entered the Knightsbridge branch of the Spaghetti House. One carried a sawn-off shotgun, the others each carried a handgun. The three demanded the week's takings from the chain—between £11,000 and £13,000. In the dim lights of the closed restaurant, the staff were able to swiftly hide the two briefcases of money under the tables. The robbers forced the staff down into the basement; the company's general manager took the opportunity to escape out of a rear fire escape while they were being moved. He alerted the Metropolitan Police, who arrived on the scene within minutes. The getaway driver, Samuel Addison, saw the plan had gone wrong, and drove off in a stolen Ford.

Siege: 28 September – 3 October

In the initial conversations the hostage-takers provided the police with the names of the hostages they held and Davies's identity and criminal record was established. By 7:00 am the police had sealed off the area and put a cordon in place; 400 police officers were involved—including dog-handlers—and D11, the Metropolitan Police's marksmen, was deployed.

Davies informed police that he was a captain in the BLF, but in a subsequent message said that the men were members of the Black Liberation Army, a Black Panther splinter group. Davies made several demands to the police. He wanted two black prisoners released from prison, although he did not know that they had already been released. He also wanted the Home Secretary to visit the siege, an aircraft made available to fly to the West Indies and a radio for them to listen to the news broadcasts of the situation. Only the request for a radio was granted.

Initially the police considered that the siege may have been a terrorist incident, but were subsequently dismissive of any political motivation, and insisted that it was only ever a criminal action. Sir Robert Mark—the Commissioner of the Metropolitan Police at the time of the siege—later wrote:

From the outset it was rightly assumed that this was a simple armed robbery that had gone wrong and any attempts by Davies, the Nigerian, to represent it as a political act were received with the derision they clearly deserved.

Tony Soares, one of the founders of the BLF, told police he knew the three men, and offered to mediate, but his offer was turned down. He added that the BLF was a peaceful organisation, and that it did not know of or support the robbery. Jenny Bourne, the co-editor of Race & Class, knew all three men and thinks they "probably had very different motives" for the robbery. Overall she considers the three, particularly Wesley Dick were driven by

the actualities of racism on the ground in Britain ... It was essentially the words of Angela Davis, George Jackson, Bobby Seale and Malcolm X that honed the resistance: 'Seize the time', 'Off the pigs', 'Fuck the man' were the themes they transposed to Britain.

On the morning of 29 September—fifteen hours after the siege had begun—one of the hostages was released as a sign of good faith. He was a 59-year-old manager of one of the outlets. On the second day another hostage was released after he fell ill. During the course of the siege Mario Manca, the Italian consul general, attempted to liaise with the men, acting as a go-between. At one stage he offered to change places with one of the hostages who was unwell, but the offer was declined. Lord Pitt, the former chairman of the Greater London Council who was West Indian-born, also attempted to negotiate with the men, but had limited success.

Peter Scott, a forensic psychiatrist at the Maudsley Hospital, gave advice about the mental state of the criminals throughout the siege. He told the police that the longer the siege went on, the more an emotional transference would take place, in which the gunmen would be less likely to kill the hostages. On his advice, the main strategy of the police was to wait as long as was needed, keep the situation calm and to talk to the hostage takers as long as possible. The siege saw an early use of fibre optic camera technology by the police as a live surveillance technique. Two cameras were used to observe what was happening in the basement storeroom. One was threaded through the wall alongside a hot water pipe; the second way was through a vent, after acid was dripped onto the metal vent using an eyedropper, to make a small hole. The police were able to monitor the movement and conversations of the three hostage-takers.

The police persuaded the media to assist them. They asked The Daily Mail not to publish a story about the arrest of one of the gang's associates. Using the information and advice from Scott, the police attempted to drive a wedge between Davies and his two colleagues. On the fourth day the police pushed a copy of The Daily Express under the door of the storeroom. It showed a photograph of Davies on the front page, describing him as the leader, and providing background information from his associates, making it look like the gang's associates were selling the information to the newspapers. Across the front page, the police wrote the name of the person suspected of providing the arms. The following day, when two of the co-conspirators were arrested, police briefed the media about the arrests and stressed the criminal, not political, aspects of the case. The men heard the news on the radio that evening, which lowered their spirits. The following morning, the men decided to surrender.

At 2:55 am the gunmen turned out the lights and began a discussion among themselves. At 3:40 am they told the police that they were giving up. After the hostages came out first—all unharmed—the police told the three men to come out one at a time. The first two threw their guns out and followed; as police led them away there was a gunshot from the room, where Davies had shot himself in the stomach with a .22 rimfire revolver. In his pocket police found a note he had written to his brother just before the robbery:

Today I set out on a mission for the people. If things go wrong I shall pass over to the warrior's rest. So if this note reaches you, it would mean that I am dead.
You must accept what happens to me as it should be accepted—with joy—because it is the most natural fate that awaits any of us blacks conscious enough to try and do something about our pathetic state of existence.

Aftermath
Davies was taken to St George's Hospital where he underwent an operation; the bullet was not removed during the process. The hostages were also taken to the same hospital for a check-up, but none needed treatment. They then gave preliminary statements to the police at Cannon Row police station.

While on remand, Davies went on hunger strike. He was visited regularly by Giovanni Scrano, one of the hostages from the siege, who had built up a relationship with Davies during the incident; the relationship was later identified as an example of Stockholm syndrome.

The trial opened on 8 June 1976. As well as Davies, Dick and Munroe, three accomplices were present, charged with different offences, including assisting the robbery (the getaway driver), supplying firearms, and conspiracy charges. Davies, Dick and Munroe refused to accept the legitimacy of the court. When asked how they pleaded to the charges, Davies shouted "We've stopped pleading—we've been pleading for 500 years. This isn't a trial—it's a lynching party." The three men turned their backs on the court and talked between themselves. The judge, Mervyn Griffith-Jones, ordered that the three men be taken back to their cells and that a plea of not guilty be entered on their behalf. One of the accomplices, Lillo Termine, pleaded guilty to the charges of conspiracy to rob the restaurant. Police said that he had been the one behind the robbery, and had planned it to pay off gambling debts. The trial ended on 30 June. Davies, Dick and Munroe were sentenced to 22, 18 and 17 years in prison respectively, Termine was given six years. One of the accomplices was acquitted and Addison, the getaway driver, was sent for re-trial as the jury could not reach a verdict. That November, following the second trial, Addison was found guilty and imprisoned for eleven years. Davies, Dick and Munroe died after being released from prison, two of them at relatively young ages; Dick changed his name to Shujaa Moshesh by the time of his death in Africa.

The Spaghetti House restaurant re-opened for business a week after the siege ended. In 2015 the Knightsbridge branch closed for business so the block could be redeveloped.

In early December 1975 members of the Provisional Irish Republican Army (IRA) were cornered in a flat on Balcombe Street, London, leading to a six-day siege by police. The lessons learned from the Spaghetti House siege, including the use of live surveillance and forensic psychologists, were put into use to bring the siege to a successful conclusion for the police. Peter Waddington, in his study of policing, writes that the police's "reputation for restraint received dramatic vindication by the way in which two highly publicised sieges were handled by the Metropolitan Police". The police used the same tactics at the Iranian Embassy siege in 1980, until the terrorists killed one of the hostages, which led to a change in tactics and the use of the Special Air Service to storm the building. Waddington considers "If there was criticism it was that the police showed an excessive disinclination to resort to force in such circumstances."

In 1976 Horace Ové, a Trinidadian-born writer and filmmaker, wrote the play A Hole in Babylon, based on the events at the restaurant; the play was later broadcast on the BBC's Play for Today series. Another fictionalised account of the crime, The Siege of Babylon, was written by Farrukh Dhondy in 1978. In 1982 Spaghetti House, an Italian comedy film, was produced which was loosely based on the events of the siege.

Notes and references

Notes

References

Sources

Books, journals and websites

News articles

External links
 BBC On this day London's Spaghetti House siege ends

1975 crimes in the United Kingdom
1975 in London
1970s crimes in London
1970s in the City of Westminster
1970s trials
Metropolitan Police operations
Hostage taking in the United Kingdom
Knightsbridge
October 1975 crimes
October 1975 events in the United Kingdom
Robberies in England
September 1975 crimes
September 1975 events in the United Kingdom
Sieges in the United Kingdom
Trials in London